Heinrich Schiff (18 November 1951 – 23 December 2016) was an Austrian cellist and conductor.

Early life
Heinrich Schiff was born on 18 November 1951 in Gmunden, Austria. His parents, Helga (née Riemann) and Helmut Schiff, were composers. He studied cello with Tobias Kühne and André Navarra and made his solo debut in Vienna and London in 1971. He studied conducting with Hans Swarowsky.

Career
Schiff made his conducting debut in 1986. He was Artistic Director of the Northern Sinfonia from 1990 to 1996, and recorded with them for the Collins Classics label.  He also held chief conductorships with the Copenhagen Philharmonic Orchestra in Copenhagen, Denmark (1996–2000), and the Orchester Musikkollegium Winterthur (1996-2001). 

In 2004, he was appointed Chief Conductor of the Vienna Chamber Orchestra and served in the post from 2005 to 2008. He stood down from the post in 2008 for health reasons. 

Schiff played the "Mara" Stradivarius (1711) and "Sleeping Beauty" made by Montagnana in Venice in 1739.  His recording of the Bach Cello Suites won prizes, and his recording of the Shostakovich concertos won the Grand Prix du Disque in 1985. His recording of the Brahms Double Concerto with Frank Peter Zimmermann and Wolfgang Sawallisch won the Deutscher Schallplattenpreis.  Composers who have written cello concertos for Schiff include John Casken and Friedrich Gulda. 

Among his students were Rudi Spring, Gautier Capuçon, Richard Harwood and Natalie Clein.

Other  
Schiff frequently experienced pain in his right shoulder and arm, the one that holds the bow, presumably caused by overexertion, but tried to ignore it. While playing in a chamber concert in Vienna on 25 April 2010 he had to take breaks during pieces due to the pain. After this evening, he never played cello in public again.

Since 2012, the 'Mara' Cello has been played by Christian Poltéra, one of Schiff's former students.

Death
Schiff died in Vienna on 23 December 2016 at the age of 65.

References

Further reading

External links 
 Intermusica agency biography of Heinrich Schiff
 Interview with Heinrich Schiff, July 3, 1989
 

1951 births
2016 deaths
People from Gmunden
Academic staff of the University of Basel
Academic staff of Mozarteum University Salzburg
Academic staff of the University of Music and Performing Arts Vienna
Austrian classical cellists
Austrian conductors (music)
Male conductors (music)